Knobloch or Knoblock is a surname. It may refer to:

Charlotte Knobloch (born 1932), Vice President of the European Jewish Congress
Clay Knobloch (1839–1903)
Eberhard Knobloch (born 1943), historian
Edgar Knobloch (1927–2013), Czech historian
Edward Knoblock (1874–1945), American dramatist
Ferdinand Knobloch (born 1916), Czech psychiatrist
J. Fred Knobloch (born 1953, aka Fred Knoblock), American singer-songwriter
Hans-Wilhelm Knobloch (1927–2019), German mathematician
Heinz Knobloch (1926–2003)
Miloš Knobloch, (born 1901, date of death unknown), Czech cyclist
Richard A. Knobloch (1918–2001)
Thoralf Knobloch (born 1962), German artist
Valentin Knobloch (born 1980), German judoka
W.H. Knobloch, namesake of the Knobloch syndrome

See also
Knobloch, de.wikipedia
Knoblauch
Jim Knobeloch, American actor

German-language surnames
Yiddish-language surnames